Edoardo Duca (born 3 May 1997) is an Italian professional footballer who plays as a midfielder for  club Modena.

Club career
Born in Milan, Duca was formed as a footballer in AlbinoLeffe youth sector. He played three Serie D seasons for Grumellese Calcio and one with OltrepòVoghera.

On 13 December 2018, he joined Serie D club Modena. Modena won the promotion this season, and Duca made his Serie C debut on 9 September 2019 against Calcio Padova.

On 16 January 2020, he was loaned to Pergolettese for a year.

References

External links
 
 

1997 births
Living people
Footballers from Milan
Italian footballers
Association football midfielders
Serie C players
Serie D players
F.C. Pavia players
Modena F.C. 2018 players
U.S. Pergolettese 1932 players